Hacı Ömer Sabancı Foundation, also known as the Sabanci Vakfi is a Turkish philanthropic organization.  Established in 1974, the foundation gives money for a variety of causes, including education and health.  They award scholarships to college students, and sponsor other educational programs. Hacı Ömer Sabancı's sons set the philosophy ("To give what this land has given to us back to its people...") in perpetuity by formally establishing the Haci Omer Sabanci Foundation (known in short as the Sabanci Foundation) in 1974, which institutionalizes the family's philanthropy in supporting the social and cultural development of Turkey.

See also
Sabancı University
Sakıp Sabancı Museum
Dilek Sabancı Sport Hall

References

External links 
 Official website (English)

Sabancı family
Foundations based in Turkey
1974 establishments in Turkey
Organizations based in Istanbul